is a Japanese harem manga series by Takeshi Fujishiro. It was first serialized in Square Enix's Monthly Shōnen Gangan magazine in January 2002, and a few years later expanded into a multimedia franchise including drama CDs, light novels, and a 26-episode anime adaptation by Studio Feel that aired in Japan between April 4 and September 26, 2007.

From the same author, there is a sister series titled Cahe Detective Club which features the cousins of certain characters from this series.

Plot
After an argument with his father, 14-year-old Ikuto Tōhōin runs away from home and out to sea, only for a massive storm to send him adrift and eventually strand him on an uncharted tropical island named . Half-drowned, he is found by a kindhearted but naive girl named Suzu, who (clumsily) resuscitates him and takes him into her care.

Soon after, Ikuto learns that Airantou was settled 130 years ago by a group of Japanese that had been shipwrecked during a voyage to Europe. Though their Meiji-era village survived and prospered to the modern day, its entire male population was claimed by a rogue wave during a fishing tournament some twelve years before. As a result, nearly every girl of Suzu's generation is desperate for a husband and immediately latches onto Ikuto as a prime candidate; to his dismay, their attentions quickly erupt into violent competition, forcing Suzu to protect him.

At first eager to escape the island (and stymied only by the quasi-magical whirlpools surrounding the entire coast), Ikuto eventually settles into his new life with Suzu, befriending her as well as many of the other girls pursuing his hand. Together, they engage in countless mishaps and adventures, heartily encouraged by not only the village matriarch - Suzu's grandmother - but the increasingly large cast of anthropomorphic animals and Youkai that also call Airantou home.

Characters

 (drama CD), Hiro Shimono (anime)
Ikuto, age 14, the main character, is stranded on Airan Island. He has inherited his grandfather's determination; the words "It's impossible!" send him into a state of berserk tenacity, usually accomplishing his goal or getting struck unconscious trying. Ikuto completely refuses to accept anything supernatural. It is revealed that a cryptic jutsu was cast on him by a specialist (Nagamasa) to makes him reject anything occult, as to not make him think Misaki as not human. Three years ago, his mother went missing during her trip to Okinawa. One day, he overheard his father and his grandfather's secretary (Hiragi Iwatsuki) talking about marriage. He misunderstood and decided to skip school in order to search for his mother to cancel the marriage, but his father found out they started to argue. He ran away on a cruise liner, arriving on the island due to a storm. Kind and helpful, Ikuto's physical ability pales in comparison to that of the women on the island at first; in the beginning he could not understand any of the animals on the Island whereas the women could (he is able to understand later). Conservative, Ikuto finds it difficult to accept Airan's freeload customs. Due to the Island's girls inexperience with boys they'll often try to seduce him, which results most of the time in failure or Ikuto having an exaggerated nosebleed and passing out. Ikuto refuses to do anything towards them, as he thinks that they only care for him because he is the only male on island.
He starts training with Karaage, after realizing his swordsmanship had decayed after he came to Airan. Ikuto is actually very smart however, acting as the island's math and science teacher, and loved to read mystery novel, proving he is very rational. Suzu seems to be the only one who has genuine feelings for Ikuto from the start though she does not realize it until later, and he develops feelings for her (and Rin) due to her kindness, but seems to deny these feelings, thinking that Suzu only sees him as family. Ikuto develops a strong rivalry with Beniyasha (Chikage's mother) who creates mischief on the island to publish his novels, especially when he flirted with Suzu that made Ikuto really jealous. In the second son-in-law contest, Ikuto won due to his training able to deceive or at least land a hit on each of the lords. 
Upon Ikuto and Misaki's reunion, their grandfather has been locating Ikuto aided by former males of Airan: Nagamasa, Machi's and Ayane's father; Tadanori, Rin's father; Hideaki, Yukino's father; Kiyomasa, Chikage's father; Takatora, Suzu's father; Hanzou, Shinobu's father; and Masamune, Misaki's biological father.

 (drama CD/anime)
Suzu, age 14, is the main female character of the story. She is an honest girl and can be very spontaneous when excited. She is the first person that Ikuto meets on the island and possibly the closest one to him. As the series progresses, Suzu develops feelings for Ikuto, but at first, she has trouble realizing it due to her inexperience with boys. Later on, she gets very jealous whenever another girl gets close to him (Manifested as a dangerous aura shaped like a murderous cat) and even attempts to have him kiss her by pretending she drowned and attempts to have a date with him. She does not mind being naked around Ikuto and does not understand why Ikuto always gets nosebleeds and passes out whenever this happens, especially when she attempts to bathe with him that she enjoys. She is still very happy to have him in her life, since she had been living alone with her pet piglet Tonkatsu (lit. "breaded pork cutlet") due to Suzuran's disappearance.
Suzu loves sweets to the point where she can be easily bribed with them, especially with the special "Mame Daifuku" treats made by Ayane's and Machi's mother. Suzu is one of the best players of shogi and other strategy games on the island, to the point that she could easily beat Ikuto. She is also good at jujutsu, and was trained by the Southern Leader because she once threw Ayane on top of a tree; although her mother was even stronger than the current Western Leader, she did not teach Suzu Jujutsu, probably due to that she wants Suzu to be more feminine. However, Suzu lacks basic education compared to most of the girls on Airan as she cannot comprehend simple mathematics and tries to skip school as much as she can. Ironically, she has demonstrated an aptitude for deduction, which is associated with intelligence and logic. She is also torn between her feelings for Ikuto and a wish that Ikuto could get off the island, although she wishes he would stay, she knows that he has his family on the outside world, and it would be wrong to keep him here.

 (drama CD), Saeko Chiba (anime)
Ayane is Suzu's rival, always being defeated by her and wanting to win at least once. The fact that she constantly loses makes Suzu somewhat doubtful of her ability as an individual. In spite of her appearance, she is actually 16-years-old, and being underdeveloped she is also jealous of Suzu's sudden growth; nevertheless, she is close friends with Suzu, usually being the first to accompany her house when Suzu's mother had disappeared. She is arrogant, often saying she is the handiest and prettiest girl on the island. She is deathly afraid of Machi, her older sister, and uses anesthetic darts as her main weapon. She hopes to take Ikuto captive and trump Suzu. She is a miko at the local shrine along with Machi and their mother Chizuru (whom Ikuto mistook for her sister at first).
She also frequently uses a giant ostrich named Monjiro as transportation. Her body has great tolerance to pain due to her extreme bad luck which caused her a great number of accidents daily. She loves super spicy food, as they are the only food Machi would not take from her. After accidentally kissing Ikuto (chapter 69), she finds that she cannot approach him without getting flustered as she developed real feelings for him. She is very intelligent being the best prankster on the island, except for Machi who almost seems to play pranks on Ayane herself.
Throughout the manga, it is shown ironically, despite her scheming personality she is actually the most pure-hearted, usually being the most considerate in situations (being the only one who did not try to spy on or sabotage Ikuto and Mei-Mei's date actually giving them a scroll with suggestions on the best date-spots on the island, being able to remember Michiru's name while others get it wrong, for example). 

 (drama CD), Mikako Takahashi (anime)
Machi is Ayane's elder sister and despite being smaller than Ayane; she is actually 18-years-old. Despite her innocent looks, Machi is something of a sadist: she often tortures Ayane with her voodoo doll, finding beauty in her pained, frightened expressions. She also tends to take the most dangerous methods to getting things done. In her childhood she often doted on her baby sister, but at some point, transition into terrorizing her. She alludes to the fact that the more she tortures people the more she likes them, suggestion her sadistic acts may be her own sign of affection. She sees herself as well past the appropriate marrying age and pursues a romance with Ikuto to avoid becoming an old maid. Because of this, her age is her biggest insecurity, and she becomes depressed whenever someone calls her old. She has a talent for magic, such as summoning shikigami, though she usually ditches all other cleaning and cooking duties at the shrine. Like her sister Ayane, she is quite proficient with using the blowgun. Machi has a habit of making surprise entrances (such as trapdoors and open ceilings). 

 (drama CD), Ryōko Shiraishi (anime)
Rin is an apprentice carpenter who is popular on Airan due to her somewhat tomboyish outfit and attitude, she was the subject of a lot of attention and romantic interest from other women before Ikuto's arrival. She found this situation so uncomfortable that she developed a tendency to bathe alone. Despite her masculine mannerisms, Rin is shown to be appallingly bad at her hard labor job of carpentry and quite skilled with domestic chores such as cooking and sewing. Initially, Rin propositions Ikuto to be her husband to prove her heterosexuality (and so end the advances made on her by the other girls); however, she and Ikuto soon develop real feelings for each other. She calls Ikuto "danna" ("hubby" or husband), much to Ikuto's chagrin. She is the strongest person on the island, which hurts her feminine pride, but she secretly was pride of her appearance. She loves to dress up, but she at first embarrassed as she thought she was not feminine enough to look good in them, till Ikuto said she look pretty.

 (drama CD), Shizuka Itō (anime)
Chikage is obsessed with scientific research, and wants Ikuto for the sole purpose of examining a real male and learning about the world beyond the island from him. She collects things that drift in from the modern world and plans on adding Ikuto to her collection, seeing him as a potentially invaluable source of information. Chikage lives in the only Western-style house on Airan with her elephant maid, Panako. She has a habit of reading mature magazines and gets misguided ideas from them to use against Ikuto. Although Ikuto believes her to be a calm, well-behaved girl, Yukino has noted that Chikage tends to perform strange experiments and questionable research. In the manga, and episode 17, she proves the truth of this statement when she briefly gains access to magic and causes havoc around the island until it is taken away by an angry Panako. Chikage soon becomes fascinated with the novels brought by Ikuto (unaware that the author is her father). In the beginning of volume 12, she explains that she, Yukino, Kunai, Shinobu and Mikoto are cousins which explains her occasional appearance in Shinobi suit.

 (drama CD), Shizuka Hasegawa (anime)
Yukino is the youngest girl on the island, being eleven-years-old, and is sensitive about her age. She has an affinity for animals and is usually seen riding one, most often a giant bear named Kuma-Kuma. Her connection to nature dates back to when she was too young to help with farm work, and was often left to play with the woodland creatures. Her habit of riding everywhere would suggest that she should tire easily, but in the anime, she is quite athletic, being able to race with her animal friends and win. She has a habit of referring to herself in the third person. In the chapter 81 manga it is shown if Yukino eats well, she will grow up to be beautiful, busty and curvy, despite her mother's build.

Shinobu is Mikoto's sister, but unlike her more of a practitioner of Bushido than a kunoichi. She meets him when he is poisoned at her house, and she gives him the antidote mouth-to-mouth. After her first meeting with Ikuto, she challenges him to a duel due to the exaggerated rumors of his strength, much to his reluctance. After Ikuto unexpectedly defeats her in a match, to his exasperation, she decides to become his apprentice. Despite being a ninja, she is a bit on the clumsy side (she trips on her own sword, then later stumbles off the edge of a cliff), and has a horrible sense of direction. But Ikuto has stated she is faster than the lords. She ends her sentences with the phrase "-de gozaru", similar to the phrase "-desu" but in an archaic form used by samurais in the past. She became a samurai due to her admiration of Miyamoto Musashi through reading books (Surprisingly, she read even though not on Ikuto's level). As a running gag, Shinobu's endurance is even higher than Ayane which indicate Shinobu's clumsiness causes even more troubles to her than Ayane's bad luck to her.

Mikoto is a kunoichi and an apprentice carpenter who is obsessed with Rin (Mikoto is so far the only girl identified as not developing any feelings for Ikuto) and always attempts to peek at or touch her body, particularly when she is bathing. She is about the same age as Suzu. She is often jealous of Ikuto to the point that she would either threaten to hurt him or outright throw shurikens and/or heavy objects at him, but in response Rin will often make short work of her. Her family, of which she is the youngest human member, consists entirely of practitioners of Ninpo and Bushido. 

Mei-Mei is an outsider just like Ikuto. Her family worked as traveling performers, but she kept messing up and embarked on a journey that got her to the island. She is very shy and reclusive, to the point where she is forced to illustrate her thoughts through drawings, and she cannot talk to a stranger unless she is wearing a disguise (usually a large tree costume) though she eventually discards this habit. She befriended the kappa, Tohno, during her travels, and the creature has accompanied her to the island. Mei-Mei develops feelings for Ikuto after he fought for her so she would not get taken away by Taiga, who wanted her to become the North Leader for (accidentally) defeating him. She apparently began reading "weird" love novels according to Tohno and began having strange fantasies about Ikuto whenever something flirty such as kissing, or bathing is mentioned. Mei-Mei trains regularly in acrobatic skills such that she has shown almost superhuman levels of agility and flexibility (capable of jumping between trees and mountain parts). She is quite intelligent as during examination day at the island's school she managed to get a perfect score on every subject. As side note, she is terrified of the police (even police cosplay) due to her past experiences on the run.

Michiru is the 16-year-old descendant of Obaba. She is a half-yōkai; her mother Tsurara is a yuki-onna. She is weak against the heat resulting in her staying indoors most of the time, though she can go out. After completing a task, she is given a snow spirit allowing her to go outside for longer periods of time. However, a running gag is that since she previously could not interact with the villagers, they now often forget or mistaken her name, much to her annoyance. She is in love with Ikuto, stating that she was the first to have romantic feelings for him since the beginning when he arrived. She has noticed him staring at her since they first met (when his stares were actually due to her resemblance to Misaki). She is very skilled with the bow and arrow, but lazy, usually sleeping and staying at home. Michiru experiences an awkward time while learning she and Misaki are related, as Misaki thinks of her as a lazy shut-in.

Obaba, originally named "Koto", is the village chief and doctor, and probably the oldest person surviving on Airantō—as depicted in the manga and the anime, she had survived since the shipwreck and is probably over 148 years old. Despite her age, she is still quite spry and strong, capable of inflicting physical punishment on the disrespectful or simply intimidating them back in line. Her specialization is medicine and pressure points. While she mostly plays a minor role in the story, there are certain events that revolve around her. She has a descendant , who appears in episode twenty-six of the anime for a moment. She wishes to act as a midwife once more, and usually force Ikuto to get married. She calls him 'no balls', and feels he is stupid for not taking advantage of his situation.
It is also revealed that she knows the Southern and Northern Leaders from their childhood and is respected greatly by them. In chapter 149 of the manga, Obaba is reincarnated into a young, nine-tailed fox-youkai that she is in fact to be, capable of possessing, mind-reading, and advance combating at least three Airan Leaders at once. She is in fact, descended from youkai, and this explained her incredible longevity.

Misaki is Ikuto's adoptive sister. Although it was not explored as much, in the letter Misaki sends to Ikuto, it can be assumed that she is very talkative. She is introduced when Suzu and the others (aside from Mei Mei) saw a picture of her with Ikuto and mistook her for his lover. 
In the original manga she is not seen as much, but seems to feel for her brother asking for dates. She appears later in the manga getting Ikuto's letter (chapter 105) and angrily exclaims that only girls are on Arian island and better not be dating her brother. She mysteriously arrive (chapter 124) and attempted to take Ikuto back to Japan, but Ikuto proved himself of his skills and decision to remain on the island. Misaki in this version is revealed to be non-blood ice youkai related to Ikuto, signaling one more rival in the island. She moves in with Ikuto, and views Suzu as a sister. Like Ikuto, Misaki often nosebleeds due to excitement, though not at girl but at cute animals in general. After Obaba's rebirth, it revealed that Misaki's biological mother is Tsurara, making Misaki and Michiru sisters. As infant Misaki had also been swept from the island along with the men, including her long-lost father, before reaching the mainland and brought to the Tōhōin household. Trying to re-acquaintance with her real mother, Tsurara intends to bring her and Michiru together, although Misaki doesn't want Ikuto and Suzu left living (romantically) alone again.

Non-human

Panako is Chikage's housekeeper who first appears in episode eight of the anime. She is a pink elephant who is very kind to others, even though a bit clumsy and ignorant to her natural superior strength as an elephant. The citizens of Airan, animal and human alike, refer to her as the most beautiful creature (or girl, like Suzu said) on the island. As shown when humans and animals switch for one arc, she is a very beautiful woman, enough to make Ikuto blush at first sight.

Tohno is a female kappa who, a thousand years before the events of the story, caused so much trouble that a monk sealed her away. The manga later stated why she was sealed. She was a troublesome youkai, that would eat farmers' cucumbers. So much a Buddhist monk would be called to deal with her. The monk tried to talk her out of her misdeed, but she refused, They would often fight, and they slowly became friends. But eventually heretic Buddhist monks focused on destroying Yokai appeared, as Tohno and the kind monk ran, he sealed her to protect her, when the heretics would disappear. Mei Mei would freed her when she left the circus and became close friends. Tohno is supposedly a skilled enough warrior break even with Machi on bare hands fight and when anything goes (Tohno as a youkai, knows magic), to defeat Pandaro, the Eastern Leader. Tohno acts as Mei Mei's older sister, protecting and helping her. She dislikes that Ikuto refuses to believe that she is a Kappa, but is ready to believe science fictional stories, like aliens.

 (drama CD), Yuki Matsuoka (anime)
Sakuya is a female mechanical doll who was built about 130 years ago on Airan by an unknown creator. She might have been created by the aliens that came to the island long ago. She owns and runs a hot spring and hotel resort at one end of the island. At times, her body parts fall off; she needs only reassemble herself to resume perfect working order. Her utmost and constant concern is the well-being of her customers, which she is programmed to protect using an arsenal of built-in weapons and surveillance equipment.

Others

He happens to be Chikage's father and older brother to Kagami. When he was young, he had influenced his wife Shizuka on doing a mystery novel which came into the Beniyasha novel series. His current location is in Japan living with the Tōhōin residents, writing novels under the name "Shimizu Seimaru", with an Airan code which Shizuka deciphered. He appears to be in the anime series in episode 20. 

Kagami is Yukino's mother. Even at her full adult height, she stands little more than a head above her daughter, and has a childish personality to match her small stature. Kagami loves games and often steals the attention of Yukino's animal friends for playtime. However, she seems to possess a hidden maturity, and commands of her own right a loyal hawk named Taka-Taka.

She is the older sister of Shinobu and Mikoto and like her sister's, she is also a kunoichi. She happens to be a teacher in the island, and she is fond of using smoke bombs to get away. She's also fond of hugging people who she thinks are small and cute. She did not appear in the anime series, but was mentioned in episode 18.

Suzu's mother who went missing three years prior to the story's start. Though Suzu has depicted her mother to Ikuto as something of a calm and gentle woman, Karaage has mentioned that it was simply a front to convince Suzu to be a lot more like a girl than her mother was although it appears that she was not completely successful as Suzu shows similar traits to Suzuran whenever she gets angry or jealous, possibly through genes. Karaage's flashbacks in chapters 76-77 reveal a lot about Suzuran and her husband, Takatora. Suzuran looks and for the most part, acts exactly like Suzu does in the present. She also shows jealousy about her future husband much in the same way Suzu does for Ikuto (a bit more extreme, however, since she uses more harsh words) though Suzuran is a bit less oblivious than Suzu, as she is able to, at least to herself, admit that she has feelings for Takatora. However, she is extremely slow to realize that Takatora had confessed to her, but eventually does and accepts his feelings. Her and Takatora also built the house that Suzu lives in which is on top of a hot spring that Takatora dug up. Takatora shares some similarity with Ikuto in appearance, except more muscular.
Suzuran is the actual strongest fighter in the island. Karaage as the strongest master doesn't even come close to her level even when joining force with Machi.

Leaders
Airan is divided into four sections, five if the surrounding waterways are included: North, South, East, and West, but also includes the surround water. Each section has its own Leader who as the strongest individual, maintains the law and order of the area. The main mission of the leaders is to not only protect their area but also the Sea Dragon God who is the Great Lord of the island and has the power to protect those from large storms. He was responsible for bringing Ikuto safely into Airantō. The leaders are as follows: 
The Northern Leader is a two-tailed oddly bipedal tiger with a prominent scar on his face named Taiga and is equally matched with the Southern Leader (they have known each other since childhood). Despite his looks and his strength, he appears to be quite a gentle individual (He reads novels, protects the cherry blossom tree and once in a while, make friendly contacts with humans and other lords except the East's) . In addition, he recently married a Tigeress who became a youkai like him, but since he is shy, he spends very little time with her, much to her annoyance. As a child he was, in fact, rather timid. He was forced to become strong, when Obaba planted the only cherry blossom on the island in the north, due to the suitable climate and then demanded that he protect it from the other northerners who might want to destroy it.
The Southern Leader is a two-tailed cat named Shima-Tora, who was Suzu's master in the martial arts and shapeshifting, and is said to have lived for over one hundred years. He generally wears disguises to change his appearance, although he can change it with magic. This involves pulling the desired form, from within his mouth, and flipping himself inside out. Due to rather macabre nature of his magic, he avoids using it. He is the leader of cats on the island and engages in a yearly battle with dogs, who also reside in the south for control. However, the battle is more of a game, as it doesn't really matter to them who wins or loses. In manga, he has a wife named Myaa that is also a two-tailed and can transform into a beautiful human girl, which she always does before meeting her husband because her real form is currently overweight due to her gourmet habit (it is said that she can easily exhaust the island's food supply and make fruits become extinct). 
The Eastern Leader is a panda named Pandaro, who seems to fear the other Leaders, implying that he is the weakest of the Leaders; he rules over the eastern forest which is feared for the fact that it is home to carnivorous plants (which ironically are his favorite food); was the first Leader whom Ikuto encountered. Pandaro is also the most hostile Leader (if not only) to outsiders, rather than Taiga who only seems unfriendly and prefers peace. He's not a yōkai but is more powerful than most, except for the leaders. He has a habit of going after females whom he thinks are cute, regardless of species, which makes his wife extremely anger, especially since he has children. He is especially fond of Mei-Mei and is the leader of her fan-club. Despite his many flaws, he takes his position as leader very seriously. 
The Western Leader is a rooster named Karaage, who lives very close to Suzu and Ikuto's house; he even has a wife and children living with them, whom he loves dearly. While he is hailed as the strongest fighter on the Island, Karaage is not a yōkai and does not have spiritual power like Taiga and Shima-Tora. As a result, he points out himself, that he is not all powerful, and is not suited for fighting spiritual power users. This does not mean, he cannot beat them, however. His strength is revealed to be from brutal training and sparring with Suzu's mother, Suzuran, as she tried to teach him to fly. She, along with Obaba are among the few people whom Karaage cannot beat. When he discovered he was a rooster and would never be able to fly, he became a delinquent for a short period before Suzuran beat him up, and forced him back on the right path.
In addition, a female orca named Sashimi dwells in the waters that surround the island and is called master of the sea. Though she does not speak, Suzu seems able to communicate with her. She does speak, when she is brought on land for the yearly festival. Sashimi's duty is to stop those who wander too close to the dangerous whirlpools that surround Airan. 
In the manga, it is revealed that the West once used to have a unnamed emperor penguin for the leader who has a descendant that later competed with Karaage for the master seat (Suzu just calls him Master).

Media

Manga
The Nagasarete Airantō manga began serialization in the January 2002 issue of Monthly Shōnen Gangan, published by Square Enix. Additional chapters were serialized in the magazine Gangan Powered, but transferred to Monthly Shōnen Gangan after Gangan Powered was discontinued in early 2009. Square Enix has published 38 tankōbon volumes and one "guide book" containing various background information as of October 2022.

Drama CDs
There have been two drama CDs released based on the series.
Comic CD Collection 30 Nagasarete Airantō Vol.1, released February 20, 2004
Comic CD Collection 32 Nagasarete Airantō Vol.2, released February 10, 2005
After the airing of the anime adaptation, several drama CDs has also been released, with the anime cast voicing their respective characters.

Light novels
There have been three light novels based on the manga version of Nagasarete Airantō written by Shōgo Mukai and illustrated by Ken Fujiyo. The first went on sale in November 2004, the second in March 2007 and the third in April 2008.

Anime
A 26-episode anime adaption of Nagasarete Airantō aired between April 4 and September 26, 2007. It was produced by the animation studio Feel, directed by Hideki Okamoto and written by Mamiko Ikeda. Four pieces of theme music are used for the anime: one opening theme and three ending themes. The opening theme is "Days" by Yui Horie. "Days" was also used as the ending theme for episode 26.

Discotek Media, who licensed the anime, released the series on Blu-ray on May 28, 2019.

Reception
As of March 2018, the manga had 3.9 million copies in circulation.

References

External links
 Official manga website 
 Official anime website 
 

2002 manga
2004 Japanese novels
Discotek Media
Feel (animation studio)
Gangan Comics manga
Harem anime and manga
Light novels
Romantic comedy anime and manga
Shōnen manga
Square Enix franchises